Bohdan Melnyk (born 4 January 1997) is a Ukrainian professional footballer who plays as a   midfielder for club Kisvárda.

Career
Melnyk is the product of the BRW-VIK Volodymyr-Volynskyi School System.

He made his debut for FC Vorskla in a game against FC Karpaty Lviv on 30 April 2016 in the Ukrainian Premier League.

He also played for Ukrainian different youth national football teams.

Career statistics
.

References

External links
Statistics at FFU website (Ukr)

1997 births
Living people
Ukrainian footballers
FC Vorskla Poltava players
Ukrainian Premier League players
Kisvárda FC players
Nemzeti Bajnokság I players
Ukrainian expatriate footballers
Expatriate footballers in Hungary
Ukrainian expatriate sportspeople in Hungary
Association football midfielders